Palaszczuk is a Polish-language rendering of the Belarusian surname "" (Paliaščuk, Palyashchuk, Paliashchuk), literally meaning "poleszuk". The surname may refer to:

Annastacia Palaszczuk (born 1969), Australian politician
Henry Palaszczuk (born 1947), Australian politician

See also
 
Polishchuk (surname)
Poleshchuk (surname)

Polish-language surnames